Elaphrus ruscarius is a species of ground beetle in the subfamily Elaphrinae. It was described by Say in 1834.

References

Elaphrinae
Beetles described in 1834